The Teen Murti Bhavan (Teen Murti House; formerly known as Flagstaff House) was built by British as the residence New Delhi of the Prime Minister of India, Jawaharlal Nehru. He stayed there for 16 years until his death on 27 May 1964. It was designed by Robert Tor Russell, the British architect of Connaught Place and of the Eastern and Western Courts on Janpath during the British Raj. Teen Murti Bhavan was built in 1930 as part of the new imperial capital of India, New Delhi as the residence of the Commander-in-Chief of the British Indian Army.

Indira Gandhi then converted the residence to museum. Today, Teen Murti houses various institutions including the Nehru Memorial Museum and Library (NMML), which runs under the Indian Ministry of Culture, and has Karan Singh as the chairman of its executive council, and the Pradhan Mantri Sangrahalaya, the newly built memorial and museum to honor the contribution of all the Prime Ministers of India. The complex also houses the offices of the 'Jawaharlal Nehru Memorial Fund', established in 1964 under the chairmanship of S. Radhakrishnan, then President of India. Teen Murti Bhavan also contains a number of mementos from various nations including England, Nepal, Somalia, China, etc. Each memento represents a notable resource of each nation. The foundation also awards the 'Jawaharlal Nehru Memorial Fellowship', established in 1968.

Also contained within the complex are the ‘Centre for Contemporary Studies’ and the Nehru Planetarium which opened in 1984.

Etymology

The house is named after the Teen Murti (literally "three statues") Memorial by British sculptor, Leonard Jennings, which stands on the road junction in front of its extensive grounds. The memorial comprises life-size statues of three soldiers, and was built in 1922 in the memory of the Indian regiments named after the three Indian princely states from where they were raised, namely the Jodhpur Horse from Jodhpur State, the Hyderabad Horse from Hyderabad State, and the Mysore Horse from Mysore State, who participated in World War I with the British 15th (Imperial Service) Cavalry Brigade in Haifa, which was then part of the Ottoman Empire.

While soldiers from Jodhpur and Mysore took field in the actual war, those from Hyderabad were employed in maintaining communication channels and serving the injured. The Jodhpur soldiers led by Major Dalpat Singh Shekhawat were at the forefront and won the Haifa war with the help of Mysore and Hyderabad forces. Major Shekhawat died fighting at Haifa. He is known as Hero of Haifa.

History

In 1911 the decision was made to transfer the winter capital of British India from Calcutta to Delhi (Simla remained the summer capital for the remainder of colonial rule). The slow, decades-long process of constructing the imperial complex in New Delhi commenced shortly thereafter.

Inaugurated as 'Flagstaff House' in 1930, the building was the winter headquarters and residence of the Commander-in-Chief of Forces in India who maintained unified command of the (colonial) Indian Army, British Army, and princely states forces. The road on which it stood was named after Frederick Roberts, 1st Earl Roberts, the Commander-in-Chief for over seven years between 1885 and 1893.

After independence in August 1947, the house became the year-round official residence and workspace of the Prime Minister, and Field Marshal Auchinleck relocated.

Following Jawarharlal's Nehru's death in office in May 1964, the house was converted into a national memorial to him comprising a library and a museum. Today, in a ground floor room of the Nehru Museum, his South Block office in the Ministry of External Affairs has been 'recreated' with the same furniture and other articles he used, along with several mementos, objects and manuscripts.

The complex has headquarters of Jawaharlal Nehru Memorial Fund, established in November 1964, Nehru Memorial Library, and also the Jawaharlal Nehru Fellowship. The Nehru Memorial Library is one of the finest ones for information on modern Indian history. Started in 1966, it functioned from the main building itself, till its present building was inaugurated within the complex grounds, in 1974.

Situated in a 30-acre estate, the building is constructed of white stone and stucco, and faces the south side of the Viceroy's House, known since independence as Rashtrapati Bhavan (Presidents House).  It has arched entrance, recessed window, and the first floor has a pillared veranda on the back on the building which overlooks the lawns.

One of the four Nehru Planetariums in India, is also situated in Teen Murti House grounds. It was inaugurated by the then Prime Minister (and Nehru's daughter), Indira Gandhi, on 6 February 1984. The planetarium's sky theatre is used for screening shows and as a gallery. The planetarium was reopened in September 2010, after renovations worth  Rs. 11 crore, ahead of the 2010 Commonwealth Games and received Queen's Baton. It now has 'Definiti optical star projector "Megastar" that can show 2 million stars.

Close to the Nehru Planetarium within the Bhavan complex, stands the Shikargah, also known as Kushak Mahal, the hunting lodge of 14th-century ruler of the Sultanate of Delhi, Firoz Shah Tughlaq (r. 1351–1388 AD). Built on a high platform of rubble masonry accessed by stairs, the near square structure contains three open bays, containing arches, with each bay further divided into three compartments. Firoz Shah's fort, Firoz Shah Kotla was situated far away on the banks of Yamuna River. Though, the 1912 map of Delhi shows a stream flowing near it towards the Yamuna. The monument is today protected by Archaeological Survey of India (ASI), and the nearby Kushak Road is named after it.

Details
Address - Teen Murti Marg (now Teen Murti Haifa Marg), New Delhi
Phone - +91-11-23015268
Shows - 11.30 am, 03:00 pm (English) & 04:00 pm (Hindi)
Entry Free for Museum 
Ticket Price for Shows only : ₹ 80 per person (adult)
Closed on Monday and Public Holidays.

References

External links

Nehru Memorial Museum and Library, New Delhi, website
Nehru Planetarium, New Delhi, website

Museums in Delhi
Government buildings in Delhi
Tourist attractions in Delhi
Residential buildings completed in 1930
Biographical museums in India
Prime ministerial residences
20th-century architecture in India